Shoichiro Hokazono is a euphonium player and soloist. He most notably played with the Central Band of the Japanese Air Self-Defense Force and plays on euphoniums made by Besson.

Background
Hokazono studied at the Shobi Conservatory in Tokyo, Japan under Toru Miura, graduating in 1994. He then continued his studies under Kaoru Tsuyuki and Steven Mead.

Career
In 1995, Hokazono appeared as guest recitalist at the International Tuba and Euphonium Conference (ITEC) held at the Northwestern University in Chicago, Illinois.

Throughout his career, Hokazono has played with several orchestral groups, including the NHK Symphony Orchestra, Osaka Philharmonic Orchestra, Sapporo Symphony Orchestra, Strasbourg Orchestra, Tokyo Symphony Orchestra, and the Tokyo Kosei Wind Orchestra.

Hokazono played solo euphonium in the Japan Air Self Defense Force Central Band before retiring in March 2013. He is also a professor at Senzoku Gakuen College of Music and at Soai University.

References

Euphonium players
People from Kagoshima
Living people
1969 births